Puramattom is a village near Thiruvalla in Pathanamthitta district, in the state of Kerala, India.

Demographics
, Puramattam had a population of 14,706 with 7,031 males and 7,675 females, reported in the India census.

References

Villages in Pathanamthitta district